Classmate is an Indian brand of student stationery products. ITC Limited (formerly Indian Tobacco Company) launched its Classmate brand in 2003 with the notebooks category. Subsequently, Classmate added pens, pencils, mechanical pencils and geometry boxes to its portfolio. It uses eco-friendly and elemental chlorine-free paper.

Products 
Classmate products include notebooks, pens, pencils, mechanical pencils, diaries, mathematical drawing instruments, scholastics,  erasers, sharpeners and scales and art stationery products.

Notebooks 

Classmate notebooks consist of many variants including notebooks, practical books, drawing books and reminder pads, with a theme on the related information inside.

Mathematical instruments 
Classmate has several types of drawing instruments available like compass, different sizes of scale and many more.

Classmate Ideas for India challenge 
Classmate launched a program called Classmate Ideas for India challenge. This was a part of the company's centenary initiative. The nationwide program would invite ideas of the youth who have the potential to transform India. Classmate Ideas for India challenge plans to reach out to 2.5 million students across 30 cities, 500 schools and 200 colleges across the country. The CII-ITC Centre of Excellence for Sustainable Development, WWF India, the Tony Blair Faith Foundation, Janaagraha and the Akshaya Patra Foundation among others are the program partners for the event. The program will encourage the finalists with an internship with relevant program partners, besides cash prizes and other rewards. Additionally, the top five winners would be sent to a one-week international study tour.

Discussions 
ITC Classmate hosted a discussion on the subject titled "Principal, Parents and Children: Building a Relationship of Mutuality". The panelists agreed on the need for greater student involvement in what they are taught, as well as the method of imparting education.

Corporate social responsibility 
Every Classmate notebook carries ITC's Corporate Social Responsibility message on its back. For every four Classmate notebooks purchased, ITC contributes 1 to its social development initiative that supports, among other projects (including development of tobacco plantations to increase cigarette production), primary education.

Classmate Young Authors Contest 
The Classmate Young Authors Contest 2004 (CYAC 2004) was initiated by ITC Limited to provide a platform for budding writers among students to showcase their talent and an opportunity to develop it through interaction with some of the country's leading literary icons.

Classmate Spell Bee 
Classmate Spell bee has completed nine seasons so far and is considered India's largest spelling competition. It aims to bring the best spellers together from every part of the nation, focusing on honing the spelling skills of Indian students in a fun and educational way. The last season winner received a cash prize of 2 lakh along with a sponsored trip to Washington DC, USA, to witness the Scripps National Spelling Bee 2015 with a parent.

Classmate Art Academy 
This first took off in 2015. Classmate launched a new initiative - Classmate Art Academy to promote its latest range of art products. The certificate training program brought together art teachers from top schools of New Delhi under one roof, to provide them with a platform to learn new skills. The property was executed by Victor Tango. Classmate recognizes the advantages of nurturing artistic pursuits in the all-round development of a child and aims at providing them with the right tools. The exciting range of Classmate Colour Crew products consist of Sketch Pens, Wax Crayons and Oil Pastels, designed to ensure that the uniqueness of each child shines through in the most colourful way.

WWF-India and ITC Ltd. promoting responsible forestry 
This first took off in 2009. ITC Classmate was  the first Indian company to join the Global Forest and Trade Network (GFTN). Paperkraft Premium Business Paper  is a product of ITC Limited and is the country's greenest paper mill. ITC contributes towards saving the environment: through ozone treatment and ECF technology to eliminate toxicity in the industrial effluents released by them into the ecosystem, and in a large scale through reforestation and water conservation by planting 8 trees for every tree used, which has greened over 1 lakh hectares since 2008.

References

External links
  of Classmate Stationery
 ITC

Indian brands
Notebooks
Pens
Writing implement manufacturers
Companies based in Kolkata
Pencil brands
ITC Limited
2003 establishments in West Bengal